Temple IV is the second studio album by guitarist and composer Roy Montgomery, released on 1 January 1996 by Kranky.

Track listing

Personnel 
Adapted from the Temple IV liner notes.
Roy Montgomery – guitar
Production and additional personnel
Brendan Burke – engineering
Jessica Meyer – illustrations

Release history

References

External links 
 Temple IV at Discogs (list of releases)

1996 albums
Kranky albums
Roy Montgomery albums